R2C may refer to:

 Bessa-R2C, 35mm still camera
 Curtiss R2C, racing aircraft
 Regency Systems R2C, Z80-based microcomputer

See also

 RC (disambiguation)
 RRC (disambiguation)
 RCC (disambiguation)
 RC2 (disambiguation)